Thomas Crew or Crewe may refer to:

Thomas Crew, 2nd Baron Crew (1624–1697), English politician
Thomas Crewe (1565–1634), English Member of Parliament and lawyer 
Thomas Crewe (died 1418), MP for Warwickshire (UK Parliament constituency)